Oregon Mutual Insurance is an independent mutual  insurance company providing property and casualty coverages for individuals, families, and businesses in the U.S. states of Oregon, Idaho, California, and Washington. Founded in 1894, Oregon Mutual Insurance is located in McMinnville, Oregon.

References

External links 
Official Site

McMinnville, Oregon
Companies based in Oregon
Economy of the Western United States
Insurance companies of the United States
Financial services companies established in 1894
Mutual insurance companies
1894 establishments in Oregon